The Czech Republic competed at the 2020 Summer Paralympics in Tokyo, Japan, from 24 August to 5 September 2021.

Medalists

Archery 

Tereza Brandtlová, David Drahonínský, Václav Košťál and Šárka Musilová have all qualified to compete.

Athletics 

Eva Datinská, Michal Enge, Tereza Jakschová, Aleš Kisý, Anna Luxová and František Serbus have all qualified to compete.

Men's field

Women's track

Women's field

Boccia 

Kateřina Cuřínová and Adam Peška both qualified in individual BC1 & BC3 events respectively.

Cycling 

Kateřina Antošová, Patrik Jahoda, Ivo Koblasa and Tomáš Mošnička have all qualified to compete.

Road  
Men

Women

Track

Equestrian

Shooting

Czech Republic entered two shooters into the Paralympic competition.

Swimming 

Six Czech swimmers have qualified to compete.

Men

Women

Table tennis

Czech Republic entered one athletes into the table tennis competition at the games. Jiři Suchánek qualified via World Ranking allocation.

Men

See also 
Czech Republic at the Paralympics
Czech Republic at the 2020 Summer Olympics

References 

Nations at the 2020 Summer Paralympics
2020
2021 in Czech sport